Paulina or Paullina  was a name shared by three relatives of the Roman Emperor Hadrian: his mother, his elder sister and his niece.

Mother of Hadrian
Domitia Paulina or Paullina, Domitia Paulina Major or Paulina Major, (Major Latin for the elder), also known as Paulina the Elder (?-85/86). Paulina was a Roman woman born in Spain who lived in the 1st century. She was a daughter of a distinguished senatorial family. Paulina originally came from Gades (modern Cádiz, Spain). Gades was one of the wealthiest Roman cities. Little is known of the life of Paulina. She may have been related to Domitia Lucilla the grandmother of Marcus Aurelius. G. Di Vita-Evard speculated that they might have been half-sisters.

Paulina married Spanish Roman Publius Aelius Hadrianus Afer, a praetor who was a paternal cousin of Roman Emperor Trajan. Paulina and Afer had two children, a daughter Aelia Domitia Paulina (75-130) and a son emperor Publius Aelius Hadrianus (76-138). Around 85/86 Paulina died of unknown causes, before her husband. After the death of her husband, her children were raised by Trajan and the Roman officer Publius Acilius Attianus.

Sister of Hadrian
Aelia Domitia Paulina or Paullina or Domitia Paulina Minor (Minor Latin for the younger) also known as Paulina the Younger (early 75–130). The younger Paulina was the eldest child and only daughter to Domitia Paulina and praetor Publius Aelius Hadrianus Afer. She was Hadrian's eldest sister and only sibling. She was born in Spain, but was of Italic descent. She was most probably born and raised in Italica (a city near modern Seville, Spain) in the Roman province of Hispania Baetica.

When her parents died around 86, she and her brother were raised by her father's paternal cousin, the Roman Emperor Trajan, and Roman officer Publius Acilius Attianus. Before the accession of Trajan to the throne in 98, Trajan had arranged for her to marry the Spanish Roman politician Lucius Julius Ursus Servianus. During Trajan's reign 98–117, Paulina and Servianus had a daughter called Julia Serviana Paulina.

Before Trajan's death in 117, Paulina and Servianus had arranged for their daughter Julia to marry the Spanish Roman Gnaeus Pedanius Fuscus Salinator, who was a man of consular rank. Julia and Salinator, in 118, had a son, a younger Gnaeus Pedanius Fuscus Salinator. When Paulina died, Servianus and Hadrian had a private ceremony for her. Hadrian was ridiculed for not granting her a full state funeral and apotheosis until pressured to do so by the senate, but granting his companion Antinous a sumptuous funeral with full divine honours.

Niece of Hadrian
Julia Serviana Paulina or Paullina also known as Julia Paulina was the daughter and only child to Spanish Roman politician Lucius Julius Ursus Servianus and Aelia Domitia Paulina. Her maternal uncle was Roman Emperor Hadrian and maternal aunt-in-marriage was Roman Empress Vibia Sabina. She was born at an unknown date during the reign of her third cousin emperor Trajan, who reigned 98–117. Her birthplace is unknown. Before Trajan's death in 117, her parents arranged for her to marry the Roman senator Gnaeus Pedanius Fuscus Salinator, ordinary consul in 118. Roman senator Pliny the Younger sent a letter of congratulations to her parents regarding her wedding (Epistulae, VI.26).

Her husband was originally from Barcelona, Spain (this was the Roman province of Hispania Tarraconensis). Salinator had the same name as his father and his father was a former consul. In 118, during Salinator's consulship, Julia and Salinator had a son, the younger Lucius Pedanius Fuscus Salinator. The elder Salinator and Julia seem to have died before 136.

Julia's father had always cherished the idea that her youthful son would one day succeed Hadrian. The aging Emperor considered Julia's son as his heir. Hadrian promoted the young Salinator, gave him special status in his court and also groomed him for his succession.

However, in 136, Hadrian changed his mind and decided to adopt Lucius Aelius Caesar as his heir. Julia's father and son were angry with Hadrian and wanted to challenge him about the adoption. To avoid any conflict, Hadrian ordered the deaths of Julia's father and son.

References

Sources
 Augustan History: Hadrian
 Hadrian (A.D. 117-138)
 Ancient Library
 Ancient Library 3125

1st-century Romans
2nd-century Romans
Romans from Hispania
Nerva–Antonine dynasty
Aelii
Domitii
Paulina
Ancient Roman prosopographical lists of women